Luna Nueva is the third studio album by Argentine singer-songwriter Diego Torres, it was released on December 17, 1996 through RCA Records. The music video for the single "Sé Que Ya No Volverás" was nominated for a Lo Nuestro Award.

Track listing

 Luna nueva. (Torres/Tomas/Wengrovski)
 Quise olvidar. (Torres/Tomas/Wengrovski)
 No lo soñé. (Torres/Tomas/Wengrovski)
 Sé que ya no volverás. (Torres/Tomas/Wengrovski)
 Sé que hay algo más. (Torres/Fernández)
 Se dejaba llevar por ti. (Vega)
 Siempre hay un camino. (Torres/Tomas/Wengrovski)
 No todo está perdido. (Torres/Tomas/Wengrovski)
 Alba. (Flores)
 Océano. (Djavan)
 Cuando el mundo da vueltas. (Torres/Tomas/Wengrovski)

References

1996 albums
Diego Torres albums
Spanish-language albums